Raising Whitley is an American reality television series that premiered April 20, 2013, on the Oprah Winfrey Network. The show ran for four seasons and in 2016, for unknown reasons, the OWN Network decided not to renew the series for a fifth season.

Premise
Raising Whitley chronicles the daily life of actress-comedian Kym Whitley and her group of friends—whom she refers to as "The Village"—as they raise baby Joshua, the child that Kym unexpectedly gained custody of. Joshua was left to Whitley after a troubled young woman, who she mentored for 15 years, had mysteriously escaped the hospital immediately after giving birth and left behind only Kym's contact information.

Production
It was announced in June 2013 that the Oprah Winfrey Network had ordered a ten-episode second season. Season 2 premiered on January 4, 2014, and expanded to hour-long episodes. On April 29, 2014, OWN announced that Raising Whitley had been renewed for another season. On July 31, 2015 OWN announced that Raising Whitley would return with brand new episodes beginning November 14, 2015. In April 2016, it was announced the show had been cancelled.

Episodes

Season 1 (2013)

Season 2 (2014)

Season 3 (2015)

Season 4 (2015-16)

Awards and nominations

External links

References

2010s American reality television series
2013 American television series debuts
2016 American television series endings
English-language television shows
Oprah Winfrey Network original programming